William Welch (born 3 April 1990) is a rugby union player and current captain for Newcastle Falcons in the Aviva Premiership; his position of choice is at Openside Flanker.  He is a product of the Newcastle Falcons Junior Academy and signed for the First XV in 2009 after representing Blaydon RFC at a National Two Level.

In July 2008, Welch represented England under 18's National Rugby Union team in Argentina. He also represented England at under 19's level and was selected as part of the 32 man England under 20 elite player squad, taking part in the RBS U20 Six Nations IRB Junior World Championship.

References

External links
 http://www.newcastlefalcons.co.uk/
 http://www.rfu.com/News/

1990 births
Living people
Blaydon RFC players
English rugby union players
Newcastle Falcons players
Rugby union flankers
Rugby union players from Newcastle upon Tyne